God's Wonderful Railway is a British children's drama television series made by the BBC. It was first shown in eight 30-minute episodes, from 6 February 1980. The cast includes Gorden Kaye, June Brown, Gerard Kelly, Richard Pearson and Terry Molloy.

Plot
The series focuses on three generations of the Grant family working on an unnamed Great Western Railway branch line. The first section, entitled Permanent Way, depicts the construction of the line in the reign of Queen Victoria, the second, entitled Clear Ahead, shows the line in operation in Edwardian times, and the third, Fire on the Line, is set during the Second World War.

Since the series was made for children, each part of the story focuses on events from the perspective of then younger members of the Grant family. The same characters reappear as adults as the story progresses, but in incidental roles.

"God's Wonderful Railway" was a nickname for the pre-nationalisation Great Western Railway.

Production
The series was written by Avril Rowlands with episodes directed by Fiona Cumming and John Prowse.

The location filming was done on and around the Severn Valley Railway. A reference is made to the area in the music for the opening and closing credits: a version of the first movement of Elgar's The Severn Suite arranged for brass band by David Lyon.

Other media
The series remains available on DVD, as a download on Amazon Prime Video in the UK, and in excerpts on YouTube.

The scripts were adapted into a series of three juvenile fiction books.

References

External links

1980 British television series debuts
1980s British children's television series
British children's drama television series
BBC television dramas
Television series about rail transport